Kody Chamberlain (born December 15, 1972) is an American comic book artist. He was born in Thibodaux, Louisiana and relocated to Lafayette, Louisiana in 1993.

Biography
Chamberlain started his comic book career with Digital Webbing Presents issue #13 with writer Troy Wall. He was the featured artist in Digital Webbing Presents #19, the first full color issue of the popular anthology with a short story titled Sherman Danger with horror writer Steve Niles. Chamberlain continued to work with writer Steve Niles on IDW Publishing's 30 Days of Night: Bloodsucker Tales for all eight issues of the limited series.

Bibliography

Comics
 Digital Webbing Presents (issue 13 published by Digital Webbing; short story titled "Intrinsic Dreams" with writer Troy Wall; story, pencils and inks)
 Digital Webbing Presents (issue 19 published by Digital Webbing; pencils, inks and colors)
 30 Days of Night: Bloodsucker Tales (issues 1 through 8 from IDW Publishing; pencils, inks and colors)
 BloodRayne: Seeds of Sin (one shot with writer Christina Z published by Echo 3 Worldwide and Digital Webbing; pencils, inks and colors)
 Event Horizon (anthology story titled "Vanishing Herd" with writer Dan Wickline from Mam Tor Publishing; pencils, inks and colors)
 Tag (miniseries; BOOM! Studios with writer Keith Giffen. Covers for issues 1 through 3; pencils, inks, colors and logo design. Issue 1; pencils, inks and colors. Issue 2, pages 1 through 7; pencils and inks)
 newuniversal: 1959 (with Kieron Gillen, one-shot, Marvel Comics, September 2008)
 Sweets: A New Orleans Crime Story: 2006 (Artist/writer with editor Andrew Brinkley)
 Pretty, Baby, Machine with Clark Westerman, three issues, Image Comics, 2008

Notes

References

External links
 
Thibodaux native making mark in comic-book business, Houma Today, December 13, 2009

Living people
1972 births
People from Thibodaux, Louisiana
Thibodaux High School alumni
American comics artists